Bank of India (Kenya) is a commercial bank in Kenya. It is one of the commercial banks licensed by the Central Bank of Kenya, the national banking regulator.

, Bank of India (Kenya) is a medium-sized financial services provider in Kenya. Its total assets were valued at approximately US$541 million (KES:51 billion).

History
Bank of India (Kenya) received its banking license on 6 May 1953. Its first office opened in Mombasa, the same year. In 1954 it opened its first branch in Nairobi, in the Heritage Building. It plans to increase its footprint to eight branches before 1 July 2015.

Bank of India Group
By virtue of its shareholding, Bank of India (Kenya) is a member of the Bank of India Group, a financial services conglomerate whose shares are listed on the Bombay Stock Exchange. The stock of the Bank of India Group is 65.9 percent owned by the Government of India and is one of the five largest banks in India, with over 4,000 branches (30 of them outside India) and over 1,650 automated teller machines. The member companies of the Bank of India Groupo include, but are not limited to, the following:

 Bank of India - India
 Bank of India (Botswana) 
 Bank of India (Kenya)
 Bank of India (Tanzania)
 Bank of India (Uganda)
 Indo-Zambia Bank Limited - Zambia - 20% shareholding
 Bank of India (South Africa) - representative office

Branches
Bank of India (Kenya) maintains branches at the following locations:

 Kenyatta Avenue Branch - Bank of India Building, Kenyatta Avenue, Nairobi (Main Branch)
 Industrial Area Branch - Unit 1D, Block D, Sameer Industrial Park, Nairobi-Mombasa Road, Nairobi
 Mombasa Branch - Bank of India Building, Nkrumah Road, Mombasa
 Westlands Branch - Progressive Park Towers, Westlands, Nairobi
 Kisumu Branch - First Floor, Tuffoam Plaza, Jomo Kenyatta Highway, Kisumu
 Eldoret Branch - Tarita Centre, Ronald Ngala Street, Eldoret
 Nakuru Branch - Nakuru
 Thika Branch - Thika

See also
 List of banks in Kenya
 Economy of Kenya

References

External links
 Website of Bank of India (Kenya)
 Website of Bank of India

Banks of Kenya
Banks established in 1953
Indian-Kenyan culture
Companies based in Nairobi
Kenyan companies established in 1953